Samuel Campbell was ship's surgeon of HMS Plumper from 1857 to 1861.  He is the namesake of Campbell Island, the location of the community of Bella Bella, and of the Campbell River on Vancouver Island, which is itself the namesake of the City of Campbell River.

References

Pre-Confederation British Columbia people
Royal Navy Medical Service officers